Persatuan Sepakbola Lamongan, or commonly known as Persela, is an Indonesian football club based in Lamongan, East Java. Currently the club plays in Liga 2, the second tier of football in the country.

History 
Although it has been established since 18 April 1967, Persela just started to show its existence in 2003, nine years after the national football competition entered the professional era in 1994. Before 2003, Persela used to play in the lower divisions (first or second division in Liga Indonesia) but now plays in the Super League.

On 15 October 2017, the main goalkeeper of Persela, Choirul Huda, died from the injuries sustained during a match against Semen Padang F.C. in a Liga 1 match, the highest tier of football league in Indonesia.

In the Winter of 2017, Englishman Judan Ali was signed on a 2 year contract as their first Technical Director

Crest

Players

Current squad

Retired numbers
*1 – Choirul Huda, Goalkeeper, 1999–2017

As a tribute to the late goalkeeper, Persela retired Huda's number 1 shirt after his death. Huda's loyalty to the club is unquestionable. From 1999 to 2017, he has never played with any other club except Persela.

Huda died after an incident in the match against Semen Padang at Liga 1 match week 29. He collided with a teammate, Ramon Rodrigues, while trying to collect the ball from an opponent and was struck in the chest. Paramedics immediately gave him sideline emergency treatment. A paramedic said that after the incident, he was still conscious and complained of a chest pain, but his condition soon relapsed and he later died from his injuries in a local hospital.

According to a doctor in the local hospital, he suffered from collision on his chest and lower jaw, which caused hypoxia that ultimately led to his death. Moreover, due to severe injury, he might also have experienced trauma to his head, neck, and chest.

Coaching Staff

Honours
Liga Indonesia Second Division
 Winners: 2001
Piala Gubernur Jatim
 Winners (5): 2003, 2007, 2009, 2010, 2012

 Supporters 
Persela Lamongan have many supporter groups, among others are LA Maniaand Curva Boys 1967''.

Kit suppliers 
  Reebok (2008–2011)
  Diadora (2011–2016)
  DJ Sport (2016)
  Lotto (2017)
  Forium (2018–2019)
  Warrix Sports  (2019 on Indonesia President Cup)
  Octagon (2020)
  Adhoc (2021)
  Grygera (2022–present)

Players on international cups

See also 
 List of football clubs in Indonesia
 Lamongan Regency

References

Works cited 
 Berita Persela Lamongan : Aslilamongan

External links 
 
 

Football clubs in Indonesia
1967 establishments in Indonesia
Football clubs in East Java
Association football clubs established in 1967